Hypatima stasimodes is a moth in the family Gelechiidae. It was described by Edward Meyrick in 1931. It is found in Mozambique.

References

Dichomeridinae
Moths described in 1931